Thein Tun Oo (also spelt Thein Htun Oo; born 16 August 1966) is a Burmese politician who served as member of parliament in the Pyithu Hluttaw for Amarapura Township from 2011 to 2016. In the 2010 Myanmar general election, he contested the Amarapura Township constituency for a seat in the Pyithu Hluttaw MP, the country's lower house. He is a spokesman and Central committee member of the Union Solidarity and Development Party.

References

External links 
 Facebook Profile
Pyithu Hluttaw Parliament : Thein Tun Oo's MP Profile

Union Solidarity and Development Party politicians
Members of Pyithu Hluttaw
1966 births
Living people
People from Mandalay Region